Hello Saferide is a Swedish twee pop band fronted by songwriter Annika Norlin. According to Norlin's MySpace, the stage name "Hello Saferide" was "inspired by an intelligent bus driver in a drug-addicted small town, don't ask." The Swedish-language version of the band's biography identifies the town as Willimantic, Connecticut.

Based on the Internet success of the song "Highschool Stalker," Hello Saferide was signed to Razzia Records in 2005.

In 2007, Norlin released a Swedish-language album under the band name Säkert! (a phrase that means "Yeah, right!", but also "Safe"). The album won her two Grammis awards in 2008, for best female pop act and best lyrics. She was chosen by Matt Groening to perform at the edition of the All Tomorrow's Parties festival he was curating in May 2010 in Minehead, England.

Annika Norlin is a journalist, and has worked for several newspapers in Sweden. She has also hosted different radio shows at Sveriges Radio P3.

Discography

Albums
as Hello Saferide 

as Säkert!

EP/Singles
as Hello Saferide 

as Säkert!

Featured in

Notes

External links
Hello Saferide
Hello Saferide on MySpace
Razzia Records 
Last.fm
Hello Saferide  at The Indie Music Database

Hello Saferide
Swedish indie pop groups